Sinocyclocheilus xichouensis is an Asian freshwater species of ray-finned fish in the genus Sinocyclocheilus. It is benthopelagic and is found in China.

References 

xichouensis
Fish described in 2013